Konrads may refer to:

 The Konrads, a band formed by David Bowie in 1962

People with the surname Konrads
 Ilsa Konrads, Australian swimmer at the 1960 Olympics 
 John Konrads, Australian swimmer at the 1960 Olympics

People with the given name Konrāds
 Konrāds Kalējs, WWII Latvian soldier, Nazi collaborator
 Konrāds Ubāns (1893–1981), Latvian painter

See also
 Conrads (disambiguation)
 Konrad (disambiguation)